Pentaethylenehexamine (abbreviated PEHA) is a organic amine. It is composed of five ethylene groups -CH2CH2- joined together in a chain by four secondary amine groups (-NH-) and terminated on each end by primary amine groups (-NH2). Pentaethylenehexamine is a hexadentate ligand, owing to the Lewis basicity of the six amine groups. Pentaethylenehexamine is in the category of polyethyleneamines and is part of mixtures of these sold commercially.

Commercial supplies of pentaethylenehexamine contain, in addition to the linear form, branched and cyclic polyamines. As an amine, it is an organic base and can form ammonium salts by reaction with various acids. Salts with counter-anions such as chloride, sulfate, nitrate, naphthalene-2-sulfonate, and tosylate. Tosylate salts can be used to separate the linear molecule from the other forms, as it is less soluble.

Properties
The infrared spectrum of pentaethylenehexamine salts show characteristics of the ammonium present. It has stretching modes, asymmetric and symmetric bending modes, but most useful absorption bands are due to rocking mode, where -NH3+ is at 810 cm−1 and -NH2+- is at 768 cm−1.

Reactions
Pentaethylenehexamine undergoes an Eschweiler–Clarke reaction with formaldehyde and formic acid to substitute all of the amine hydrogen atoms with methyl groups, giving octamethylpentaethylenehexamine (OMPEHA).

Pentaethylenehexamine can rearrange to form N,N′-bis(2-aminoethyl)piperazine-1,4-diethylamine.

Ligand
As a ligand pentaethylenehexamine is abbreviated peha or PEHA. It is a strong field ligand. It can coordinate cobalt, nickel, copper, zinc, cadmium lanthanum, neodymium, europium, samarium, lead, thorium, or uranium.

Use
Pentaethylenehexamine is used in ion exchange resins, eg Lewatit 6718 HLH.

Pentaethylenehexamine has been investigated as a component in carbon dioxide capture, including direct from the air for conversion to methanol.

References

Ethyleneamines
Hexadentate ligands
Secondary amines